Goji, also Kushi or Chong'e, is a West Chadic language of Nigeria.

Further reading

References

West Chadic languages
Languages of Nigeria